Arben Fahri Imami (born 21 January 1958) is an Albanian politician and former actor. He served as the minister of defense between 2009 and 2013.

Biography
Imami was born in Tirana, and attended the High Institute of Arts of Tirana between 1977 and 1981. Later he was a professor at the Academy of Arts of Tirana. He is one of the founders of the Democratic Party of Albania in 1990, and has been elected a Member of Parliament in five legislatures.

Political posts Imami has held include minister of legislative reform and parliament relations from 1997 to 1999, minister of justice from 2000 to 2001, minister of local government and decentralization from 2000 to February 2002, and from 2005 to 2009 he was the chief of cabinet of the prime minister.

During 1999 and 2000, he had a fellowship at the School of Foreign Service of Georgetown University in Washington, D.C.

He has acted in three films, Face to Face (1979)  "Në çdo stinë" (1980) and (Vajzat me kordele te kuqe)  Te shoh ne sy (1986)

See also
1997 rebellion in Albania

References

External links
 Arben Imami at the Council of Ministers website
 Biography at the Ministry of Defense website.

1958 births
Living people
Walsh School of Foreign Service alumni
Democratic Party of Albania politicians
Politicians from Tirana
Government ministers of Albania
Defence ministers of Albania
21st-century Albanian politicians
Justice ministers of Albania